Selfie Raja is a 2016 Indian Telugu-language comedy film starring Allari Naresh, Sakshi Chaudhary, and Kanwa Ranawat. It is a remake of the Kannada film Victory (2013). At the time of release, the film proved to be the highest-grossing film for Allari Naresh. The film made 1.3 crs in the Nizam region.

Cast 

Allari Naresh as Selfie Raja (dual roles)
Sakshi Chaudhary
Kamna singh Ranawat as the police commissioner's daughter
Nagineedu as the police commissioner
Saptagiri as a thief
Prudhvi as Ankusham 
Thagubothu Ramesh as the drunk Kattappa 
Shakalaka Shankar as Katraj
Ravi Babu as Mams
Satya as Mams's assistant
Krishna Bhagawan
Rajitha
Balli Reddy
Ajay Ghosh 
Chammak Chandra
Snigdha
Sudigali Sudheer as Police constable

Production 
Sakshi Chaudhary was cast opposite Allari Naresh for the second time after James Bond (2015). Newcomer Kanwa Ranawat was signed to play one of the lead actresses.

Soundtrack

Release 
Sify wrote that "Despite no proper script, Selfie Raja offers some laughs in the first half, but the movie meanders into a mess post interval. Except for few scattered laughs and spoofs, the second half is bore". The Times of India gave the film a rating of two-and-a-half out of five stars and noted that "Cut to 2016, four years after the release of one of his best films, Sudigadu (2012). Naresh is still making films. But sadly, he hasn't been able to deliver anything with punch and yet again, Selfie Raja just adds to that dull streak of his career". The Hindu stated that "Selfie Raja by Eshwar Reddy looks like a movie made in a hurry, inspired by a selfie concept".

References

External links 

2016 films
2010s Telugu-language films
Indian comedy films
2016 comedy films
Telugu remakes of Kannada films
Films scored by Sai Karthik